The Godsal was a sports car designed in 1935 by Charles Godsal (1907-1965), son of barrister and inventor Herbert Godsal, and built by Research Engineers Ltd of London, UK.

The Godsal Sports Tourer incorporated a contemporary Ford Flathead V8 engine with single dual-throat carburetor achieving approximately 85bhp at 5,500rpm, 4-speed Riley preselector transmission, sliding pillar front suspension with live rear axle, 4-wheel drum brakes, and coachwork by Corsica.

The Godsal V8 Corsica featured prominently in the 1969 movie Mosquito Squadron.

References

Sports cars
1930s cars
Cars introduced in 1935